Kargaly (formerly Fabrichnyy) is a village in Almaty Region of south-eastern Kazakhstan.

External links
Tageo.com

Populated places in Almaty Region